Gymnancyla is a genus of snout moths. It was described by Philipp Christoph Zeller in 1848.

Species
Subgenus Gymnancyla
Gymnancyla canella (Denis & Schiffermüller, 1775)
Gymnancyla sfakesella Chrétien, 1911
Subgenus Spermatophthora Lederer, 1852
Gymnancyla hornigii (Lederer, 1852)
Subgenus Dentinodia Ragonot, 1887
Gymnancyla craticulella (Ragonot, 1887)
Unknown subgenus
Gymnancyla barbatella Erschoff, 1874
Gymnancyla ruscinonella (Ragonot, 1888)

References

Phycitini
Pyralidae genera